Cathryn Leigh Carson is a historian of science, known for her biography of Werner Heisenberg.
She holds the Thomas M. Siebel Presidential Chair in the History of Science at the University of California, Berkeley.

Education and career
Carson earned a bachelor's degree in history and philosophy of science in 1990 from the University of Chicago. She moved to Harvard University for graduate study, and completed her doctorate there in 1995. Her dissertation was Particle physics and cultural politics : Werner Heisenberg and the shaping of a role for the physicist in postwar West Germany.

She joined the Berkeley history department in 1996.
Carson was editor-in-chief of the journal Historical Studies in the Natural Sciences from 2008 to 2013.

Book
Carson is the author of a biography of Werner Heisenberg, Heisenberg in the Atomic Age: Science and the Public Sphere (Cambridge University Press, 2010).

Recognition
In 2014, Carson was elected as a Fellow of the American Association for the Advancement of Science.
She was given the Thomas M. Siebel Presidential Chair in the History of Science in 2016.

References

Year of birth missing (living people)
Living people
American historians of science
American women historians
University of Chicago alumni
Harvard University alumni
University of California, Berkeley College of Letters and Science faculty
Fellows of the American Association for the Advancement of Science
Historians from California
20th-century American historians
Fellows of the American Physical Society
20th-century American women writers
21st-century American historians
21st-century American women writers